Lam Chun (born 14 October 1992) is a Hong Kong social activist and former member of the Yuen Long District Council for Shui Wah. He is currently convenor of the Tin Shui Wai Connection.

Biography
Raised in Yuen Long, Lam formed Tin Shui Wai Connection with other Tin Shui Wai netizens in 2019 aiming at contesting in the 2019 District Council election against the pro-Beijing incumbents.  Lam ran against pro-Beijing incumbent Chow Wing-kan in Shui Wah and received 3,955 votes, winning the seat by a margin of 1,691 votes. He is chair of the council's Finance and Administration Committee. On 8 July 2021, Lam announced his resignation from the District Council after the government introduced the new mandatory oaths of allegiance.

Politics
Lam stands as an independent democrat. He opposes legislation to enact Article 23 of the Hong Kong Basic Law.

References

1992 births
Living people
District councillors of Yuen Long District
Hong Kong democracy activists
Hong Kong localists
Tin Shui Wai Connection politicians